Hermann Friedrich Staabs, von Staabs (born March 11, 1859 in Aachen; died September 7, 1940 in Kassel) was a German infantry general in World War I and commanding general of the XXXIX. Reserve Corps.

Biography
As a second lieutenant, Staabs was transferred from the cadet corps to the 62nd (3rd Upper Silesian) Infantry Regiment of the Imperial German Army on April 14, 1877. From October 1, 1879 to January 31, 1884 he served there as battalion adjutant and was then transferred to the 59th (4th Posen) Infantry Regiment. From October 1, 1885, Staabs attended the Prussian Staff College for three years.

He spent most of his military career on the Great General Staff. Here he rose to head of the railway department. After the First World War he wrote a book in which he contradicted Moltke's view that it would not have been possible to quickly shift the focus of the German deployment to the Eastern Front.

On June 16, 1913, Staabs was raised to the hereditary Prussian nobility on the occasion of the 25th anniversary of the reign of Kaiser Wilhelm II.
Even before the outbreak of World War I, Staabs was the commander of the 37th Division. In August 1914, was his division of the in East Prussia with the 8th Army on the Eastern Front. His troops fought as part of the XX. Army Corps under Friedrich von Scholtz in the Battle of Tannenberg and in the Battle of the Masurian Lakes. From June 15, 1915 to July 6, 1916, Staabs was the commander of the 3rd Division. His troops fought in the breakthrough Battle at Przasnysz in July 1915 and then pursued to the lower Narew. In September they advanced to Wolkowysk ago and went from 20 October between Naroch and Dryswjatysee for years of trench warfare until it was over. For his work he had received the swords of the Order of the Red Eagle, II. Class and the royal crown in August 1915.

On July 7, 1916, he succeeded Otto von Lauenstein as commander of the XXXIX. Reserve Corps. The corps was transferred to the Romanian theater of war after Romania declared war in August 1916. As part of the 9th Army under the command of Erich von Falkenhayn, his troops distinguished themselves especially in the Battle of Kronstadt in early October. Together with the I. Reserve Corps, 
he held out against the Romanians on the ridge of the Fagaras Mountains until the end of November. For participating in the occupation of Ploesti and taking Bucharest on December 6, 1916 he was awarded the Pour le Mérite on December 11, 1916.

On December 3, 1917, Staabs was appointed General of the Infantry. The corps was involved in the German spring offensive in 1918 as part of the 2nd Army. From March 17 to May 22, 1918 Staabs commanded both this corps and the XIII (Royal Württemberg) Corps. On May 15, 1918, he was also awarded the oak leaves for the Pour le Mérite for the services of his troops.

He was the father of Gerdhild von Staabs (1900–1970), the founder of the Scenotest.

References

Bibliography
 Hans Friedrich Huebner: "Officer list of the 2nd Upper Rhine Infantry Regiment No. 99." E.S. Mittler & Sohn, Berlin 1906, p. 77.
 Falkenhayn, Erich von, 9th Army Campaign against Romanians and Russians, Atelierele Grafice Socec & Co S.A., Bucharest, 1937
 Kiritescu, Constantin, History of the war for the unification of Romania, Scientific and Encyclopedic Publishing House, Bucharest, 1989
 Ioanițiu Alexandru (Lt.-Colonel), Războiul României: 1916-1918, vol 1, Tipografia Geniului, București, 1929
 Romania in the World War 1916-1919, Documents, Annexes, Volume 1, Official Gazette and State Printing Offices, Bucharest, 1934
 The General Headquarters of the Romanian Army. Documents 1916 - 1920 , Machiavelli Publishing House, Bucharest, 1996
 Military history of the Romanian people, vol. V, Military Publishing House, Bucharest, 1989
 Romania in the years of the First World War, Militară Publishing House, Bucharest, 1987

1859 births
1940 deaths
Generals of Infantry (Prussia)
German Army generals of World War I
Recipients of the Pour le Mérite (military class)
People from the Rhine Province
Military personnel from Aachen